Nimtoh, released internationally as Invitation, is a 2019 Indian Nepali-language drama film directed by debutante Saurav Rai and stars Pravesh Gurung.

Cast 
Pravesh Gurung as Tashi
 Chandra Dewan
 Suni Rai
Teresa Rai
 Digbijay Singh Rai

Production  
Many of Saurav Rai's family members play supporting roles in the film, which was shot in Rai's village near Darjeeling. The film is about a theft that occurs during a wedding.

Release 
The film was screened at Kazhcha-Niv Indie Film Fest 2019 and at the Cannes Film Festival 2019. The film was also one of ten films selected to be part of the India Gold competition at the MAMI Mumbai Film Festival 2019.The Hollywood Reporter wrote that "Like the aesthetic choice to keep events offscreen, one has to wonder how such a heavy veil over the narrative advances the story, when a straightforward account would have deepened our understanding of the characters’ relationships and maybe offered emotional inroads into a tale that tends to be empathetic, yes, but also dry and distanced".

Awards and nominations 
NFDC Film Bazaar 2018 - Prasad Labs DI Award and Moviebuff Appreciation Award - Won
MAMI Mumbai Film Festival 2019 - Jury Award for Screenwriting - Won

References

External links 

Indian drama films
2019 films
Nepalese drama films